The 2020 Tuscan regional election was the 7th regional election held in Tuscany, Italy, and took place on 20 and 21 September 2020. It was originally scheduled to take place on 31 May 2020, but it was delayed due to the coronavirus pandemic in Italy. The Democratic candidate, Eugenio Giani, defeated the League candidate, Susanna Ceccardi. Giani took office as President of Tuscany on October 8, 2020.

Electoral system
Tuscany uses its own legislation of 2014 to elect its Regional Council. The councillors are elected in provincial constituencies by proportional representation using the D'Hondt method. The constituency of Florence is further divided into 4 sub-constituencies. Preferential voting is allowed: a maximum of two preferences can be expressed for candidates of the same party list and provided the two chosen candidates are of different gender.

In this system, parties are grouped in alliances supporting a candidate for the post of President of Tuscany. The candidate receiving at least 40% of the votes is elected to the post and his/her list (or the coalition) is awarded a majority of 23 seats in the Regional Council plus the seat of the President (24+1 seats with more than 45% of the vote). If no candidate gets more than 40% of the votes, a run-off is held fourteen days later, where the two top candidates from the first round run against each other. The winning candidate is then ensured a majority in the Regional Council.

Council apportionment
According to the official 2011 Italian census, the 40 Council seats which must be covered by proportional representation are so distributed between Tuscan provinces. The number of seats to be assigned in each province is the following:

The Province of Florence is further divided into smaller electoral colleges.

Parties and candidates

Opinion polls

Candidates

Hypothetical candidates

Parties

Results

Results by province and capital city

Turnout

</onlyinclude>

See also
2020 Italian regional elections

References

2020 elections in Italy
2020 regional election
2020
Tuscan regional election 2020